Ognjen Lakić (born 1 August 1978) is a former Serbian football player.

External links
 

1978 births
Living people
Serbia and Montenegro footballers
Serbian footballers
Serbian expatriate footballers
Expatriate footballers in Russia
Expatriate footballers in Georgia (country)
Expatriate footballers in Bosnia and Herzegovina
Expatriate footballers in Israel
Expatriate footballers in Belarus
Expatriate footballers in Hungary
Expatriate footballers in Cyprus
Russian Premier League players
FK Hajduk Kula players
OFK Bečej 1918 players
PFC Krylia Sovetov Samara players
FC Dinamo Tbilisi players
FK Rudar Ugljevik players
FK Radnički Sombor players
FK Srem players
Hapoel Tel Aviv F.C. players
Maccabi Petah Tikva F.C. players
FC Vitebsk players
BFC Siófok players
Aris Limassol FC players
Association football forwards